is a former professional Japanese baseball player. He played outfielder for the Yokohama DeNA BayStars.

External links

NPB.com

1986 births
Living people
Japanese expatriate baseball players in Mexico
Nippon Professional Baseball center fielders
People from Yokohama
Sultanes de Monterrey players
Yokohama BayStars players
Yokohama DeNA BayStars players